Kaas Tailored is an American furniture and upholstery manufacturer based in Mukilteo, Washington.

Background and history
Kaas Tailored was founded by cousins Larry and Allan Kaas in 1974 under the name Kaasco International, Inc. The company operated out of an old barracks building at Boeing. The cousins later had a falling out, and in 1980 Larry Kaas reformed the company on his own, naming it Kaasco, Inc. In 1981, Nordstrom placed its first order with Kaasco, and the company began providing furniture for Nordstrom's shoe department. In 1984, Kaasco began producing for the aerospace industry. Kassco moved to Mukilteo, Washington in 1992. In 1997, Larry Kaas' son, Jeff Kaas, took over the company. In 2000, the company was renamed Kaas Tailored after the name caused confusion with Costco.

In the 1990s, Boeing, a client of Kaas Tailored's, adopted the Lean manufacturing philosophy and encouraged other companies to adopt the philosophy. In 1999, Jeff Kaas toured Toyota Motor Company factories in Japan which were using The Toyota Way. Kaas Tailored adopted kaizen principles at its factory. Kaas Tailored began providing tours to other companies such as Nordstrom, Starbucks, Boeing, Providence Medical Group, Amazon and Microsoft. In 2017, the company began providing consulting services for other companies such as Nordstrom.

2020-present
In 2020, during the COVID-19 pandemic, Kaas Tailored was one of the first manufacturing companies to pivot from their usual operations to producing personal protective equipment. Kaas Tailored worked with Providence Medical Group to lead the "100 Million Mask Challenge." The company switched from making furniture to making masks and face shields for Providence Medical Group hospitals and Swedish Health Services. Kaas Tailored also sent a prototype to a company in Holland, who began making masks for its local hospitals. Jeff Kaas also coached health care systems in South Africa, Albania, Ireland, and the Netherlands in his model for manufacturing personal protective equipment. The prototype and instructions were also posted online along and sent to companies in 25 states so that others could join in to produce masks. Nordstrom worked with Kaas Tailored to begin producing masks at its factories as well. Kaas Tailored worked with partnership companies, Alaska Airlines and Boeing to ship personal protective equipment, and partnered with the Washington Aerospace Training and Research (WATR) Center at Edmonds College, which produced face shields. The company manufactured about 4,000 masks per day. In the last two weeks of March 2020, the company manufactured more than 100,000 masks and 30,000 face shields.

Awards and recognition
1996 Boeing Supplier of the Year
Business Journal's Covid Relief Champion Award for PPE

References

Companies based in Mukilteo, Washington
Companies based in Snohomish County, Washington
Mukilteo, Washington
Furniture retailers of the United States
Manufacturing companies established in 1974